Salon Selectives is a line of hair care products, ranging from shampoos and hair conditioners to hair mousses, sprays, gels, and oils. Salon Selectives was the first salon-inspired mass market hair care brand, introduced by Helene Curtis in 1987. It was acquired by Unilever in 1996 and was restructured in 2000 with all-new products. In 2011, the line was relaunched again with 32-ounce bottles designed to give consumers salon grade product at everyday value pricing.

Original level-based lineup (1987–2000) 
When originally introduced in 1987, Salon Selectives was conceived as a level-based product line of shampoos, conditioners, and styling products. SS shampoos had rosy-red bottles with level numbers, while Salon Selectives conditioners were in lighter pink ones bearing letter labels signifying type. Popularized by Helene Curtis, the brand proved to be a success, with a 6.5 percent market share and annual sales of $275 million in the late 90s (making it the second most successful hair care brand in the US). 

Revamped theme-based lineup (2000–2006)

During 2000, the Salon Selectives product line was revamped. Most notably, the product line was no longer sold in the distinctive red and pink bottles. The then-new theme-based product line was introduced in September 2000; products bore catchy names, and were all housed in clear containers.

Brand revitalization (early 2011)

In 2010, the rights to the Salon Selectives brand was acquired by CLT International, a global health and beauty trader and brand acquisition company. CLT brought back a line of hair care products (including shampoo, conditioner, styling aids and hair brushes) in early 2011. The red and pink bottles and green apple scent have been restored. In addition to conventional advertising vehicles, CLT International is launching an aggressive social media campaign (featuring sites like Facebook and Twitter) to target a younger and broader demographic.

Salon Selectives is, as of 2018, being marketed as a discount brand, with its standard size bottle available at a constant one-dollar price point.

Acquisition by ECB (2018)
Salon Selectives was acquired by Evergreen Consumer Brands on May 31, 2018.

External links
Official website
Beauty Byte: Salon Selectives makes a comeback

References 

Products introduced in 1987
Hairdressing
Shampoo brands
Unilever brands